Townes is the 13th studio album by American singer-songwriter Steve Earle, released in 2009.  It is an album on which he pays tribute to his friend and mentor, the late singer-songwriter Townes Van Zandt by covering his songs. According to a New West Records press release, "The songs selected for Townes were the ones that meant the most to Earle and the ones he personally connected to (not including selections featured on previous Earle albums). Some of the selections chosen were songs that Earle has played his entire career ("Pancho & Lefty", "Lungs" and "White Freightliner Blues") and others he had to learn specifically for recording.

Notable guest appearances on the album include Tom Morello (of Rage Against the Machine/Audioslave/Street Sweeper Social Club) playing electric guitar on "Lungs", and Earle's wife Allison Moorer singing backing vocals on "Loretta" and "To Live Is to Fly".  Earle and his son, Justin Townes Earle trade verses on "Mr. Mudd & Mr. Gold".  He is backed by The Bluegrass Dukes on "White Freightliner Blues" and "Delta Momma Blues".

This album won Best Contemporary Folk Album at the 52nd Grammy Awards.

A two disc CD version included a subset of the songs performed solo by Earle. This bonus set was also released on vinyl for Record Store Day.

Track listing

Disc One: Townes

Disc Two: The Basics
(included in 2-CD version)

Personnel
 Steve Christensen - percussion, audio engineer 
 Shad Cobb - fiddle
 Dennis Crouch - bass
 Justin Townes Earle - guitar, vocals
 Allison Moorer - vocals
 Tom Morello - electric guitar 
 Greg Morrow - drums
 Tim O'Brien - mandolin
 Darrell Scott - banjo, resonator guitar 
 John Spiker - electric bass
 Steve Earle - vocals, guitar, mandola, harmonica, harmonium

Chart performance

References

2009 albums
Steve Earle albums
Albums produced by Steve Earle
Townes Van Zandt tribute albums
New West Records albums